Teresa Jacobo was a former California politician. She had been a member of the Bell City Council from 2001-2010, and served as Mayor in 2003.

Jacobo was born in Jalisco, Mexico and came to the United States with her father when she was a year old. She is also a real estate agent for Century 21 Rainbow Properties in Bell, California.

She is Legislative Ambassador for the American Cancer Association, and ACS CAN, Board Member of Friends of Bell Foundation (foundation for the youth), Board Member for the Southeast Education Foundation, and Board Member of the Salvation Army.

Recently, she was found to have received $100,000,  along with other Bell City Council members, and was investigated for stealing money from the City of Bell along with 3 council members, Robert Rizzo (former city manager), Randy Adams (former police chief), and Angela Spaccia (former assistant city manager).

On September 21, 2010, Jacobo was arrested, 
along with seven other Bell officials and charged with misuse of city funds and various other charges.

She is one of eight (8) Bell officials and council members sued by then-Attorney General Jerry Brown for fraud, civil conspiracy, waste of public funds and breach of fiduciary duty.

References

External links
Official homepage

Living people
Mayors of places in California
Women mayors of places in California
People from Bell, California
Year of birth missing (living people)
21st-century American women